Hero Honda - Sa Re Ga Ma Pa Singing Superstar is the 4th installment of the Sa Re Ga Ma Pa Challenge series which premiered on 13 August 2010 on Zee TV. This series is hosted by Manish Paul, although the first shows were hosted by Purab Kohli. The mentors during this season are Daler Mehndi, Vishal–Shekhar (Vishal Dadlani and Shekhar Ravjiani) and Sajid–Wajid (Sajid Ali and Wajid Ali).

Contestants

Winner
Kamal Khan (singer), Patiala (1989), Team Vishal–Shekhar

Finalists
Abhilasha Venkatachalam, Pune (1988), Team Daler
Bishakh Jyoti, Kolkata (1987), Team Sajid–Wajid

Eliminated
 Abhishek Mukherjee, Kolkata (1988), Team Vishal–Shekhar
Ali Sher, Faislabad, Pakistan (1985), Team Vishal–Shekhar
Altamash Faridi, Saharanpur (1989), Team Sajid–Wajid
Dipanwita Choudhury, Hooghly (1983), Team Sajid–Wajid
Fareed Hasan Niyazi, New Delhi (1985), Wild Card Challenger
Karma Sherpa, Darjeeling (1984), Team Vishal–Shekhar
Khurram Iqbal, Faislabad, Pakistan (1989), Team Sajid–Wajid
Maampee Nair, Shillong (1987), Team Vishal–Shekhar
Madhura Kumbhar, Mumbai (1988), Team Vishal–Shekhar
Mugdha Hasabnis, Dombivli (1988), Team Daler
Nakul Abhyankar, Mangalore (1990), Team Daler
Ranjeet Rajwada, Jaipur (1992), Team Daler
Rini Chandra, Vancouver, British Columbia, Canada (1986), Team Sajid–Wajid
Shreyasi Chakraborty, Kolkata (1989), Team Sajid–Wajid
Sniti Mishra, Odisha (1987), Team Daler
Sugandha Mishra, Mumbai (1989), Team Vishal–Shekhar
Tajinder Singh Ahuja, Faridabad (1993), Team Daler

References

External links
 Official website
 Saregamapa Singing Superstar
 Saregamapa Singing Superstar Fan Club

Sa Re Ga Ma Pa
2010 Indian television series debuts